The Journal of Symbolic Computation is a peer-reviewed monthly scientific journal covering all aspects of symbolic computation  published by Academic Press and then by Elsevier. It is targeted to both mathematicians and computer scientists. It was established in 1985 by Bruno Buchberger, who served as its editor until 1994.

The journal covers a wide variety of topics, including:
 Computer algebra, for which it is considered the top journal
 Computational geometry
 Automated theorem proving
 Applications of symbolic computation in education, science, and industry

According to the Journal Citation Reports, its 2020 impact factor is 0.847. The journal is abstracted and indexed by Scopus and the Science Citation Index.

See also 
 Higher-Order and Symbolic Computation
 International Symposium on Symbolic and Algebraic Computation

References

External links 
 

Mathematics journals
Computer science journals
Publications established in 1985
Elsevier academic journals
Monthly journals
English-language journals
Computer algebra